Laurent Lessard (born October 28, 1962 in Thetford Mines, Quebec) is a politician and notary in Quebec, Canada. He was the Member of the National Assembly for the provincial ridings of Frontenac and Lotbinière-Frontenac from 2003 to 2018 in Central Quebec south of Quebec City. Member of the Quebec Liberal Party, he was the Minister of Agriculture, Fisheries and Food and the Minister responsible for the Centre-du-Québec region which includes Victoriaville and Drummondville.

Biography
Lessard obtained a licence in law at the Université de Sherbrooke. He was a notary from 1989 to 1998 before being elected as mayor of Thetford Mines in 1999. He would also be a member of the executive committee of the L'Amiante Regional County Municipality, Quebec.

He jumped to provincial politics in the 2003 provincial election and was elected in Frontenac. After being for nearly two years the Parliamentary Secretary for the Minister of Municipal Affairs, Sport and Leisure he would become after a Cabinet shuffle the Minister of Labour in 2005. When Yvon Vallières took time off due to health reasons in 2006, he would temporarily had the portfolios of Agriculture, Fisheries and Food for a few weeks before obtaining them after the 2007 elections when Vaillières was no longer part of the cabinet. He was also temporarily the Minister responsible for Chaudière-Appalaches prior to the 2007 elections.

Lessard kept the same Cabinet positions following the Liberal majority gained in the 2008 elections. On June 23, 2009, following a Cabinet shuffle, Lessard replaced Nathalie Normandeau as the Minister of Municipal Affairs and Regions and Land Occupancy while Claude Béchard became the new Minister of Agriculture.

External links
 

1962 births
Quebec notaries
French Quebecers
Living people
Mayors of Thetford Mines
Members of the Executive Council of Quebec
Quebec Liberal Party MNAs
Université de Sherbrooke alumni
21st-century Canadian politicians